Henry Stephen Fox-Strangways, 3rd Earl of Ilchester, PC (21 February 1787 – 8 January 1858), styled Lord Stavordale from birth until 1802, was a British peer and Whig politician. He served as Captain of the Yeomen of the Guard under Lord Melbourne from 1835 to 1841.

Background and education
Stavordale was the eldest son of Henry Fox-Strangways, 2nd Earl of Ilchester, and Mary Theresa O'Grady, daughter of Standish O'Grady. He was educated at Christ Church, Oxford, which later (1814) awarded him a DCL.

Political and Yeomanry career
Lord Ilchester succeeded his father as third Earl of Ilchester in 1802. On 15 April 1808, he was commissioned a captain in the Dorsetshire Yeomanry. The regiment was disbanded in 1814. He was commissioned major in it on 8 December 1830 when it was re-formed.

On 5 August 1835 he was appointed Captain of the Yeomen of the Guard in the Whig administration of Lord Melbourne.  He was made a Privy Counsellor on 12 July 1837. Ilchester was replaced as Captain of the Yeomen of the Guard on 5 July 1841, shortly before the government's fall. He was also appointed Lord Lieutenant of Somerset on 19 April 1837, but the resigned from the post in May 1839.

On 6 June 1840, he was promoted from major to lieutenant-colonel in the Yeomanry. He was made lieutenant-colonel commandant of the Dorsetshire Yeomanry on 12 February 1846, resigning the command in July 1856.

Family
Lord Ilchester married Caroline Leonora Murray, daughter of Lord George Murray, in 1812. They had four children:
Henry Thomas Leopold Fox-Strangways, Lord Stavordale (7 January 1816 – 11 August 1837), captain in the Dorsetshire Yeomanry 1837
Lady Theresa Anna Maria Fox-Strangways (11 January 1814 – 2 May 1874), married Edward Digby, 9th Baron Digby on 27 June 1837.
Stephen Fox-Strangways, Lord Stavordale (21 March 1817 – 25 May 1848), cornet in the Dorsetshire Yeomanry 1838, later captain
Lady Caroline Margaret Fox-Strangways (9 January 1819 – 26 June 1895), married Sir Edward Kerrison, 2nd Baronet on 23 July 1844.

Lady Ilchester died giving birth to her fourth child. Lord Ilchester died at Melbury House on 8 January 1858, aged 70. Both his sons had predeceased him and he was succeeded in his titles by his half-brother, William Fox-Strangways.

Arms

The arms of the head of the Fox-Strangways family are blazoned Quarterly of four: 1st & 4th: Sable, two lions passant paly of six argent and gules (Strangways); 2nd & 3rd: Ermine, on a chevron azure three foxes' heads and necks erased or on a canton of the second a fleur-de-lys of the third (Fox).

References

1787 births
1858 deaths
Alumni of Christ Church, Oxford
Earls of Ilchester
Lord-Lieutenants of Somerset
Members of the Privy Council of the United Kingdom
Whig (British political party) politicians
Queen's Own Dorset Yeomanry officers
Henry